Erin Sweeny is an Australian psychologist, recognized with a 100 Women award by the BBC in 2016 for her work in treating sex offenders.

Career
Sweeny is the president of the Western Australia committee of the Australian and New Zealand Association of Psychiatry, Psychology and Law (ANZAPPL) and is a member of the Western Australia subcommittee of the national committee of the College of Forensic Psychologists of the Australian Psychological Society.

According to her ANZAPPL profile, she joined the Department of Corrective Services in Western Australia in 1989. At the Department, she worked as a community corrections officer and in the Sex Offender Treatment Unit. She worked in the United Kingdom for three years until returning to Western Australia in 2003. She currently works in private practice.

In 2016, she was chosen as one of BBC's 100 Women.

She believes that sex offenders are redeemable. She says that these offenders "always an unhappy childhood - usually due to abusive, neglectful, absent or simply unengaged parenting."

References 

Australian psychologists
BBC 100 Women
Living people
1960s births
Australian women psychologists